The 1996 Jacksonville State Gamecocks football team represented Jacksonville State University  as an independent during the 1996 NCAA Division I-AA football season. Led by Bill Burgess in his 12th and final season as head coach, the Gamecocks compiled a record of 1–9. Jacksonville State played home games at Paul Snow Stadium in Jacksonville, Alabama.

Schedule

References

Jacksonville State
Jacksonville State Gamecocks football seasons
Jacksonville State Gamecocks football